Sigma Iota Rho is a collegiate honor society for international studies recognized by the International Studies Association.

The purpose of ΣΙΡ is to promote and reward scholarship and service among students and faculty in higher education so as to foster creative performance and integrity in the conduct of world affairs. Its members are predominantly advanced undergraduates (juniors and seniors) who have demonstrated exceptional academic performance and engagement in international affairs. These individuals are guided by faculty advisors from over 140 colleges and universities with established chapters.

Founding
Aptly, the Greek letters representative of the society is: sigma denotes synesis, meaning "prudence"; iota for ideodoi, "ideals"; and rho for rhomi, "power."

Its vision statement is:
To promote and reward scholarship and service among students and practitioners of international affairs and global studies so as to foster integrity and creative performance in the conduct of international relations.

Among the founders of ΣΙΡ was the late-Dr. William C. Olson, Ph.D., then-dean of the School of International Service at American University, who served as its first president. Also among the group was Theodore Couloumbis, Ph.D., who determined the society's Greek letters and identity.

Currently, the president and national director of SIR are Dr Frank Plantan, Ph.D., co-director of the University of Pennsylvania's International Relations Program.

While not a member of the ACHS, Sigma Iota Rho is an honor society.

Members
Members of Sigma Iota Rho take part in advancing the honor society's cause for furthering study and awareness of international affairs. To this end, they collaborate yearly to produce the Journal of International Relations, the leading undergraduate periodical in its field. Additionally, the national office of the honor society administers an award scheme that funds worthy research projects by fellow members. At the local level, ΣΙΡ's chapters routinely host extracurricular events in enriching local campus and communities. Typically these include hosting speaker events, networking events, and fundraising drives for a particular global issue or cause.

Induction is based on standards similar to those of Phi Beta Kappa. Students with outstanding academic credentials in international relations, global affairs, and other majors in the domain of international studies are nominated by their local chapters for induction into Sigma Iota Rho. Generally, they undergraduates who are in the top percentiles of their classes and areas of study.

Nominees are submitted to the national office of the honor society for verification and approval. Upon induction, students have issued a certificate confirming membership, regalia for graduation ceremonies, and invited to participate in the organization's national networking group on LinkedIn.

In effort to distinguish the efforts of those whom serve as models of the honor society, the national office announced in summer 2012 national commendations, the "Faculty Advisor" and "Featured Chapter" Awards. The first recipient of the faculty distinction was Francine D'Amico, Ph.D., advisor of Syracuse University's chapter, Alpha Chi—housed in the Maxwell School of Citizenship and Public Affairs—which won the Featured Chapter Award.

Journal of International Relations
The premier undergraduate peer-reviewed periodical for international affairs, the Journal of International Relations has a physical circulation of over 3,000 copies to over 150 institutions affiliated with Sigma Iota Rho and the Association of Professional Schools of International Affairs. Each edition features a special article by a leading voice in international relations. This year’s edition is marked by Pascal Lamy, Director-General of the World Trade Organization. Past contributors include Richard Haass, president of the Council on Foreign Relations and Robert Zoellick, president of the World Bank.

Born in 1998 as an in-house journal for the University of Pennsylvania's International Relations Program—under the direction of Frank Plantan, Ph.D. and Bruce Newsome, Ph.D. -- it became a national publication in 2004. Current and back editions are found digitally, through Sigma Iota Rho's website, and in the Library of Congress.

Chapters 

Alpha: American University
Beta: University of South Carolina
Gamma: University of Wisconsin, Oshkosh 
Delta: University of Wyoming
Epsilon: University of Pennsylvania
Zeta: University of Denver
Eta: North Carolina State University
Theta: Rhodes College
Iota: Juniata College
Kappa: The Citadel
Lambda: Michigan State University
Mu: Indiana State University
Nu: California State University Chico
Omicron: San Francisco State University
Pi: University of South Florida
Rho: West Virginia University
Sigma: University of Delaware
Tau: University of Michigan
Upsilon: Lehigh University
Phi: College of Charleston
Chi: Bradley University
Psi: University of Dayton
Omega: Brigham Young University
Alpha Alpha: Kenyon College
Alpha Beta: University of Missouri–St. Louis
Alpha Gamma: Miami University
Alpha Delta: University of New Hampshire
Alpha Epsilon: Baylor University
Alpha Zeta: Texas State University
Alpha Eta: University of Colorado Boulder
Alpha Theta: Ohio Wesleyan University
Alpha Iota: George Washington University
Alpha Kappa: Wells College
Alpha Lambda: Trinity University
Alpha Mu: Baldwin-Wallace University
Alpha Nu: Wheeling Jesuit University
Alpha Xi: University of Nebraska at Omaha
Alpha Omicron: James Madison University
Alpha Pi: Pepperdine University
Alpha Rho: Stonehill College
Alpha Sigma: University of Wisconsin-Whitewater
Alpha Tau: Dickinson College
Alpha Upsilon: Loyola University, Chicago
Alpha Phi: University of St. Thomas
Alpha Chi: Syracuse University
Alpha Psi: Virginia Polytechnic Institute

Alpha Omega: Virginia Commonwealth University
Beta Alpha: Fairfield University
Beta Beta: State University of New York, Geneseo
Beta Gamma: Nazareth College
Beta Delta: Georgia State University
Beta Epsilon: University of Montevallo
Beta Zeta: Old Dominion University
Beta Eta: Manhattan College
Beta Theta: Kansas State University 
Beta Iota: Elon University
Beta Kappa: Seton Hall University
Beta Lambda: Georgia Institute of Technology
Beta Mu: Fordham University
Beta Nu: Slippery Rock University
Beta Xi: Hult International Business School, London
Beta Omicron: Lynchburg College
Beta Pi: Brenau University
Beta Rho: Florida International University
Beta Sigma: Lake Forest College
Beta Tau: University of Alabama at Birmingham
Beta Upsilon: Lafayette College
Beta Phi: Moravian College
Beta Chi: Tufts University
Beta Psi: Samford University
Beta Omega: Shippensburg University
Gamma Alpha: Morehouse College
Gamma Beta: Washington University in St. Louis
Gamma Gamma: University of California, Irvine
Gamma Delta: The College of New Jersey
Gamma Epsilon: University of Bridgeport
Gamma Zeta: Adelphi University
Gamma Eta: University of Mount Union
Gamma Theta: University of Georgia
Gamma Iota: University of South Alabama
Gamma Kappa: Seattle University
Gamma Lambda: DePauw University
Gamma Mu: University of North Texas
Gamma Nu: Endicott College
Gamma Xi: Spring Hill College
Gamma Omicron: State University of New York, Fredonia
Gamma Pi: Lycoming College
Gamma Rho: University of Vermont
Gamma Sigma: Ohio State University
Gamma Tau: Sweet Briar College
Gamma Upsilon: Ramapo College
Gamma Phi: Millersville University of Pennsylvania
Gamma Chi: Johns Hopkins University

Gamma Psi: Arkansas at Little Rock, University of
Gamma Omega: American Military University, American Public University System
Delta Alpha: Bucknell University
Delta Beta: University of Redlands
Delta Gamma: University of Utah
Delta Delta: Iona College
Delta Epsilon: Roanoke College
Delta Zeta: University of Illinois, Urbana-Champaign
Delta Eta: Rollins College
Delta Theta: Hope College
Delta Iota: Oklahoma State University
Delta Kappa: Emmanuel College
Delta Lambda: Arcadia University
Delta Mu: Chapman University
Delta Nu: Chicago State University
Delta Xi: Rutgers University
Delta Omicron: Rochester Institute of Technology
Delta Pi: California State University, Monterey Bay
Delta Rho: Utah State University
Delta Sigma: Loyola University Maryland
Delta Tau: College of Saint Elizabeth
Delta Upsilon: Georgia Gwinnett College
Delta Phi: Trinity Washington University
Delta Chi: Stephen F. Austin State University
Delta Psi: American Graduate School of International Relations and Diplomacy, Paris
Delta Omega: Meredith College
Epsilon Alpha: Washington and Jefferson College
Epsilon Beta: Heidelberg University
Epsilon Gamma: Mercy College
Epsilon Delta: Norwich University
Epsilon Epsilon: Concordia College
Epsilon Zeta: Brigham Young University, Idaho
Epsilon Eta: University of Miami
Epsilon Theta: Georgia Southern University
Epsilon Iota: Stetson University
Epsilon Kappa: Bethune-Cookman University
Epsilon Lambda: Saint Louis University
Epsilon Mu: Roger Williams University
Epsilon Nu: University of California, Berkeley
Epsilon Xi: State University of New York, Oneonta
Epsilon Omicron: University of Kentucky
Epsilon Pi: University of North Carolina, Wilmington
Epsilon Rho: De Paul University
Epsilon Sigma: Bryant University
Epsilon Tau: Lebanon Valley College
Eta Alpha: Webster University

See also
Association of Professional Schools of International Affairs

References

External links
 Sigma Iota Rho's official website
 Journal of International Relations website

Honor societies
Student organizations established in 1984
1984 establishments in Washington, D.C.